Gheorghe Condovici (born 30 July 1941) is a Romanian gymnast. He competed in eight events at the 1964 Summer Olympics.

References

1941 births
Living people
Romanian male artistic gymnasts
Olympic gymnasts of Romania
Gymnasts at the 1964 Summer Olympics
Gymnasts from Bucharest